The Borderland Thunder are a defunct Junior "A" ice hockey team from Fort Frances, Ontario, Canada.  They were a part of the Superior International Junior Hockey League.

History
Despite four successful season in the SIJHL and a league title, the Thunder have opted to sit on the sidelines of Canadian Junior hockey.  Although they still had an open door to re-enter the Thunder Bay-based league, they have applied the past three seasons for entry into the Manitoba Junior Hockey League .

A return to the SIJHL is unlikely for the Borderland Thunder, as their place in the SIJHL has since been succeeded by the Fort Frances Jr. Sabres as of the 2007–08 season.

Season-by-season results

Playoffs
2002 Lost Final
Fort Frances Borderland Thunder defeated Thunder Bay Bulldogs 4-games-to-3
Dryden Ice Dogs defeated Fort Frances Borderland Thunder 4-games-to-none
2003 Won League, Lost Dudley Hewitt Cup semi-final
Fort Frances Borderland Thunder defeated Dryden Ice Dogs 4-games-to-none
Fort Frances Borderland Thunder defeated Thunder Bay Bulldogs 4-games-to-1 SIJHL CHAMPIONS
Third in Dudley Hewitt Cup round robin (1-2)
Wellington Dukes (OPJHL) defeated Fort Frances Borderland Thunder 3-2 in semi-final
2004 Lost Semi-final
Dryden Ice Dogs defeated Fort Frances Borderland Thunder 4-games-to-3
2005 Lost Final
Fort Frances Borderland Thunder defeated Dryden Ice Dogs 4-games-to-none
Fort William North Stars defeated Fort Frances Borderland Thunder 4-games-to-none

External links
SIJHL Website

2001 establishments in Ontario
2005 disestablishments in Ontario
Defunct Superior International Junior Hockey League teams
Sport in Northern Ontario
Fort Frances